Don Ornitz (February 29, 1920 – January 14, 1972) was an American photographer.

Life and career 
Ornitz was born in New York City, to parents Sadie (née Lesser) and screenwriter Samuel Ornitz, one of the Hollywood Ten accused of Communism. His brother was a cinematographer Arthur J. Ornitz. In 1928, the family moved to California, he spent most of his life.

Career 
Ornitz photographed many celebrities, including Raquel Welch, Frank Sinatra, Walt Disney, and Audrey Hepburn.  His obituary in Popular Photography magazine called him "the Titan of the Hollywood photographers".

He was also a photographer for several magazines, including Playboy, Travel and Camera, The Saturday Evening Post, Look, Pageant, Globe, Sports Illustrated and Life.

His photograph of boys catching insects on a windowpane was selected by Edward Steichen for the 1955 Museum of Modern Art world-touring exhibition The Family of Man that was seen by 9 million visitors.

As were many members of the entertainment community including his father, Ornitz was called before the House Un-American Activities Committee.

Ornitz died January 14, 1972, in Los Angeles County, California.

Books by Don Ornitz 

 Ornitz, D. (1962) Living Photography, Maco.
 Basch, P., Gowland, P., & Ornitz, D. (1958). Candid Photography. Fawcett Publications: Greenwich, Conn.

References 

1920 births
1972 deaths
20th-century American photographers
Photographers from New York City